

Surname
 Patrick Deneen (skier) (born 1987), U.S. freestyle skier mogulist
 Patrick Deneen (author) (born 1964), U.S. author of Why Liberalism Failed
 Charles S. Deneen (1863-1940), governor of Illinois
 Bina Deneen (1868-1950), wife of Charles S. Deneen, first lady of Illinois

Given name
 Deneen Graham (born 1964), U.S. dance teacher
 Leeah Deneen Jackson (born 1998), U.S. actress
 Dante Deneen Washington (born 1970), U.S. soccer player

See also
 Dannen
 Dennen (disambiguation)
 Dineen
 Dinneen